Kremen is a mountainous village in southwestern Bulgaria in the Bansko Municipality of the Blagoevgrad Province. It is situated on the eastern slopes of Pirin 16 kilometers southeast of Bansko and 54 kilometers southeast of Blagoevgrad. The village is 6 kilometers away from the secondary international road 19 Blagoevgrad-Bansko-Gotse Delchev-Drama. The ruins of the Kremen fortress are situated 4 kilometers northwest of the village. The fortress is small - 600 m² and built of local stone.

Villages in Blagoevgrad Province